The 1958 Drexel Dragons men's soccer team was the 12th season of the program's existence. The program competed as an independent during the 1958 ISFA season, the final year before the NCAA began sponsor collegiate varsity soccer.

The 1958 season was the most accomplished season in program history. Drexel posted a perfect 12-0-0 record, and won the ISFA National Championship, the predecessor to the NCAA Division I Men's Soccer Championship. The Dragons scored a record 76 goals in 12 matches, while only conceding 15. Drexel was led by Polish striker Stanislav Długosz, who had 57 points on the season, which remains a record for Drexel. During their match against Rider, Igor Lissy had a program record three assists, a record that would not be tied until 1991. Lissy led the team in scoring with 22 goals in just 12 matches. Outside of the ISFA title, Drexel won the Middle Atlantic States Athletic Conference.

Robert Muschek, Długosz and Ozzie Jethon were named All-Americans at the end of the season.

Head coach Donald Y. Yonker was inducted  into the United Soccer Coaches Hall of Fame in 1992.

Roster 
The following players were part of Drexel's squad during the 1958 season:

Schedule 

|-
!colspan=6 style=""| Exhibition
|-

|-
!colspan=6 style=""| Regular season
|-

|-
|}

References 

Drexel Dragons
Drexel Dragons
Drexel Dragons men's soccer seasons
Drexel Dragons, Soccer
Drexel
Intercollegiate Soccer Football Association Championship-winning seasons